The Springs International School is an English medium school located in Tana, a village on the Nilambur to Calicut Nilambur Gudallur state highway in Kerala, India. It was established in 2012.

External links
 Official Website

References

International schools in India
Schools in Malappuram district
Educational institutions established in 2012
2012 establishments in Kerala